William John "Jack" McClelland (11 August 1930 – 2004) was an English footballer who played in the Football League for Rochdale, Swindon Town and Stoke City.

Career
McClelland was born in Colchester and played for local side Colchester United. He impressed in the club's reserve side and was spotted by scouts at First Division Stoke City who paid a small fee to acquire his signature. However, he failed to impress managing just four matches in 1952–53 and none the following season. He left the Victoria Ground in August 1954 and spent a season with Swindon Town and then Rochdale.

Career statistics
Source:

References

English footballers
Stoke City F.C. players
Colchester United F.C. players
Swindon Town F.C. players
Rochdale A.F.C. players
English Football League players
1930 births
2004 deaths
Association football forwards